The 1985 Milan Indoor (also known as the Fila Trophy for sponsorship reasons) was a men's tennis tournament played on indoor carpet courts in Milan, Italy. The event was moved to the PalaLido after heavy snowfall had collapsed the roof of the Palazzo dello Sport in January 1985 and caused its closure. The event was part of the 1985 Nabisco Grand Prix. It was the eighth edition of the tournament and was played from 23 March until 31 March 1985. First-seeded John McEnroe won the singles title, his fourth at the event after 1979–1981.

Finals

Singles

 John McEnroe defeated  Anders Järryd 6–4, 6–1
 It was McEnroe's 3rd singles title of the year and the 62nd of his career.

Doubles

 Heinz Günthardt /  Anders Järryd defeated  Broderick Dyke /  Wally Masur 6–2, 6–1

Prize money

*per team

References

External links
 ITF tournament edition details

Milan
Milan Indoor
Milan Indoor
Milan Indoor